Dharma Sabha was formed in 1830 in Calcutta by  Radhakanta Deb. The organization was established mainly to counter the ongoing social reform movements led by protagonists such as Raja Ram Mohun Roy and Henry Derozio. More specifically, the impetus of forming the organization came from a new law enacted by the colonial British rule which banned the barbaric practice of burning widows alive (sati) in the country; the focus of the new association was to repel the law which was seen as an intrusion by the British into the religious affairs of the indigenous people by some sections of the Hindu community. The Dharma Sabha filed an appeal in the Privy Council against the ban on Sati by Lord William Bentinck as, according to them, it went against the assurance given by George III of non-interference in Hindu religious affairs; however, their appeal was rejected and the ban on Sati was upheld in 1832. It published a newspaper called Samachar Chandrika.

The Dharma  Sabha campaigned against the  Hindu Widow Remarriage Act, 1856 and submitted a  petition against the proposal  with nearly four times more signatures than the one submitted for it by Ishwar Chandra Vidyasagar. However   Lord Dalhousie personally finalized the bill despite the opposition and it being considered a flagrant breach of Hindu customs as prevalent then, and it was passed by Lord Canning.

The organization soon morphed into a 'society in defense of Hindu way of life or culture'.

References 

Political organisations based in India
1829 establishments in India
Hindu organizations
Hindu nationalism
Defunct Hindu organizations